Eisbär (English: Polar Bear) was a wolfpack of German U-boats that operated from 23 to 29 August 1942 in World War II. This pack was assembled to operate in the South Atlantic off Cape Town which was considered to be virgin waters. Some of the most experienced U-boat commanders available such as Harald Gelhaus, Werner Hartenstein and Carl Emmermann were included.

U-boats, commanders and dates
 , Karl-Friedrich Merten, 25 August–1 September
 , Werner Hartenstein, 25 August–1 September
 , Carl Emmermann, 25 August–1 September
 , Georg von Wilamowitz-Möllendorf, 25 August–1 September
 , Hans-Georg Friedrich Poske, 25 August–1 September

Ships hit by this Wolfpack

Clan Macwhirter

References

Wolfpacks of 1942